Sanchakou Township is a township under the administration of Qahar Right Front Banner in Inner Mongolia, China. , it has 18 villages under its administration.

The Sanchakou railway station is a station of the Beijing–Baotou railway.

References 

Township-level divisions of Inner Mongolia
Qahar Right Front Banner